Kim Yong-nam (born 14 May 1958) is a North Korean former footballer. He represented North Korea on at least fifteen occasions between 1980 and 1990, scoring three times.

Career statistics

International

International goals
Scores and results list North Korea's goal tally first, score column indicates score after each North Korea goal.

References

1958 births
Living people
North Korean footballers
North Korea international footballers
Association football forwards
Footballers at the 1990 Asian Games
Asian Games competitors for North Korea